SS Finland was an American-flagged ocean liner built in 1902 for the Red Star Line. During World War I she served as a transport for the United States Navy named USS Finland (ID-4543). Before her Navy service in 1917, she was also USAT Finland for the United States Army.

SS Finland sailed for several subsidiary lines of International Mercantile Marine, including the Red Star Line, and also under charter for the White Star Line, the Panama Pacific Line, and the American Line. Sailing out of New York, she sailed primarily to ports in the United Kingdom, Belgium, and Italy. She also briefly sailed on New York to San Francisco, California, service. In 1912, Finland was chartered by the American Olympic Committee to take the U.S. team to the 1912 Summer Olympics in Stockholm, Sweden.

At the entry of the United States into World War I in April 1917, the liner was chartered by the United States Army as USAT Finland. She made five transatlantic runs under Army control ferrying troops to Europe. On the return portion of her third voyage, Finland was torpedoed by U-93, but was able to safely return to port for repairs. In April 1918, Finland was transferred to the U.S. Navy and commissioned as USS Finland. She completed an additional five voyages to Europe, carrying almost 13,000 troops. After the Armistice, she returned over 32,000 troops to the United States before being decommissioned in September 1919.

After her Navy service ended, she was returned to International Mercantile Marine, resumed her original name of SS Finland, and served on New York to Europe routes until 1923, when she returned to New York–San Francisco service. Finland was scrapped in 1928.

Launching and early career 
Finland was launched on 21 June 1902 by William Cramp and Sons, Philadelphia, for the Red Star Line of International Mercantile Marine (IMM). She accommodated 342 passengers in first class, 194 in second class, and 626 in third class.

Finland sailed on her maiden voyage from New York to Antwerp on 4 October under the American flag, and remained on this route for the next seven years. In November 1907, as the liner neared Antwerp, a gale in the English Channel almost drove Finland ashore. The timely assistance of two tugs kept the big ship from grounding on the breakwater at Dover. By January 1909, Finland had been reflagged under the Belgian flag, but remained on the New York–Antwerp route.

In March 1909, the liner was chartered to the White Star Line, another IMM subsidiary, for three round-trip voyages between Naples and New York. Six crew were lost from Baltique. Returning to the Red Star Line's New York–Antwerp service, Finland was reflagged in January 1912, sailing under the American flag once again. During this time, noted German-American psychologist Hugo Münsterberg sailed on Finland to Europe to attend a Psychological Congress in Berlin in April 1912.

1912 Olympics 
After setting aside rooms for all the team members, additional space aboard the ship was sold for the benefit of the AOC. The delegation of 164 athletes left New York at 09:30 on 14 June.  dining rooms were divided during the voyage, so that the athletes on board would have "their own cuisine" and not be tempted to partake in "promiscuous indulgence in the great variety of food" on the ship.

The AOC, aided by  crew, made several accommodations for shipboard training en route to the Games. Longer distance runners would practice their starts on the track, and train by running laps around the deck, which was about one-tenth of a mile (160 m) for one circuit. While practicing their strokes, they would wear a belt suspended from an overhead rope that kept them in the middle of the tank. The cycling team worked on the forward deck with bikes secured to the ship's structure.

Some of the individual athletes came up with ideas to further their training while at sea. Discus champion James Duncan had the ship's carpenter bore a hole in the middle of a discus, through which he attached a rope tied to the ship's rail. Duncan would then throw the discus out to sea, and then haul it back in by the rope. Theodore Roosevelt Pell, the only U.S. competitor in any of the tennis events, set up a  backstop on the after deck, practicing for hours each day.

Finland arrived at Antwerp on the morning of 24 June after a ten-day voyage over smooth seas. While the ship took on stores, the athletes completed their training at a local athletic club. Sailing at noon on 26 June, Finland reached Sweden four days later. There were no injuries during the entirety of the voyage, and, unlike the trip of the next American Olympic delegation in 1920—when the so-called "Mutiny of the Matoika" took place—no threats of a strike because of bad conditions aboard the ship.

World War I 
After her Olympic charter ended, Finland returned to her usual New York–Antwerp route until the outbreak of war in Europe in August 1914. The Red Star liner, still sailing from New York, shifted to call at Liverpool beginning 22 August for two roundtrips. Next moved to Mediterranean service, Finland sailed from New York to Naples and Piraeus starting in November 1914. To complete her third and final circuit to the Mediterranean, she began her last voyage from Italy back to New York on 24 March 1915.

By early May, Finland and sister ship Kroonland had both been chartered to the IMM subsidiary Panama Pacific Line for New York to San Francisco service via the Panama Canal. The trips took about 17 days each way and called at either Los Angeles or San Diego on both eastbound and westbound trips.

Finland was next chartered to the American Line, yet another IMM subsidiary, for service from New York to Falmouth and London beginning on 26 October. After completing two circuits, the liner was returned to New York–Liverpool service on 19 January 1916. At some point during this period, Finland was equipped with four  guns, manned by members of the U.S. Navy's Naval Armed Guard.

On 18 December 1916, during an eastbound journey, Finland was halted by a French warship. According to Marjorie Crocker, an American woman headed for refugee work in Paris, the cruiser had fired a shot across the bow of Finland, and then queried the officers of the liner. After allowing Finland to go on her way, the French ship circled around several times, then headed off first in one direction and then another, as if, according to Crocker, it were searching for something.

Finland was still in New York–Liverpool service when the United States declared war on the German Empire in April 1917. The United States Army, needing transports to get its men and materiel to France, had a select committee of shipping executives pore over registries of American shipping. On 28 May, the committee selected Finland and thirteen other American-flagged ships that were sufficiently fast, could carry enough coal in their bunkers for transatlantic crossings, and, most importantly, were in port or not far at sea. After Finland discharged her last load of passengers, she was officially handed over to the Army at noon on 2 June, the last of the fourteen ships acquired.

U.S. Army service 

Before any troop transportation could be undertaken, all of the ships had to be hastily refitted—in two weeks in the case of Finland. Of the fourteen ships, ten, including Finland, were designated to carry human passengers; the other four were designated as animal ships. The ten ships designated to carry troops had to have all of their second- and third-class accommodations ripped out and replaced with berths for troops. Cooking and toilet facilities had to be greatly expanded to handle the large numbers of men aboard. Finland, uniquely among the fourteen ships, already carried guns and did not need to be refitted for them. All the ships were manned by merchant officers and crews but carried two U.S. Navy officers, Navy gun crews, quartermasters, signalmen, and wireless operators. The senior Navy officer on board would take control if a ship came under attack.

The headquarters detachment and six companies (of a total of 12) of the 18th Infantry Regiment embarked on Finland at New York. The ship, under the command of U.S. Navy Commander S. V. Graham, departed with her group on 14 June for Brest, France, steaming at a comfortable  pace. A thwarted submarine attack on the first convoy group, and reports of heavy submarine activity off of Brest resulted in a change in the convoy's destination to Saint-Nazaire.

Finland, carrying some of the troops that had tried to depart on 30 July on  before she sank near Staten Island, had an uneventful roundtrip. According to Crowell and Wilson, the 8th group was "destined to misfortune". Three days out from New York, Lenape developed engine trouble and was compelled to return to port, but the rest of the convoy proceeded on and arrived in France on 7 October. Henderson was the only ship to return to the United States without incident. On 17 October, Antilles was torpedoed by U-105, sinking in 6 minutes with the loss of 67 out of the 234 men on board.

Finland, returning most of the survivors of Antilles back to the U.S., was struck on her starboard side by a torpedo from U-93 at 09:27,  from the French coast. Many of the civilian crew and the survivors of Antilles, experiencing a torpedo attack for the second time in 11 days, panicked. Lifeboats were immediately launched without word from Commander Graham, and the engine room and fire room men all left their stations, contrary to orders. The naval officers, armed with a revolver and a wooden mallet, were able to get the men back to their stations. The damage was limited to one cargo hold and had not affected the boilers or the engines. Although Finland took a starboard list, it did not increase and Graham was able to steer a course back to Brest, anchoring there the next morning. Men aboard the prematurely launched lifeboats were rounded up by Wakiva II and Alcedo and returned to Brest. Nine men, including three of the Naval Armed Guard detachment, two soldiers and four crew perished in the attack.

In the aftermath of the torpedoing incident, Commander Graham was awarded the Navy Distinguished Service Medal for his "exceptionally meritorious service" in getting Finland safely back to port. Lieutenant (junior grade) Huntington English, from Wakiva II, received the Navy Cross, in part because he rescued a soldier who had jumped from the torpedoed transport. Chief Boatswain's Mate John P. Doyle, on Alcedo, was issued a letter of commendation for commanding a whaleboat that pulled a number of men from Finland from the water.

The deportment of the crew aboard Finland, as well as that of Antilles, while under attack demonstrated the problems with civilian-manned vessels. The Navy, led by the recommendations of Rear Admiral Albert Gleaves, insisted that all troop transports be manned entirely by Navy personnel. This was accomplished soon after so as to avoid the need for what Gleaves called "ignorant and unreliable men" who were "the sweepings of the docks".

Finland was sufficiently repaired over the next two months and sailed for return to the United States on 5 January 1918. After safely reaching Saint-Nazaire, Finland discharged her passengers and cargo that included  of frozen beef for the AEF. On 27 February, one day after departing,  steering gear jammed, forcing her into the path of Henderson. That ship was able to maneuver such that Finland only dealt her a glancing blow. Finland suffered only superficial damage; Henderson was holed below the waterline, but her crew took advantage of unusually calm February seas to repair the damage, and were soon able to proceed to New York. Finland and President Lincoln arrived back at New York on 16 March.

Finland made one more crossing under Army charter. Finland returned to New York on 24 April, and was delivered to the U.S. Navy the same day.

U.S. Navy service 
Finland was commissioned on 26 April. The transport's move from Army to Navy control little changed her routine. Rendezvousing with the convoy were two transports sailing from Newport News, Virginia, Martha Washington and Powhatan.  provided the convoy with protection until its arrival in France on 12 May. Finland and Manchuria both returned to New York on 30 May.

The convoy had a false alarm when a floating barrel was mistaken for submarine, but otherwise uneventfully arrived at Brest on the afternoon of 27 June. Finland and Kroonland arrived back at New York on 13 July. Covington was not so fortunate. On her return journey, she was torpedoed by U-86 on 1 July, and sank the next afternoon.

On 26 July, Finland, loaded with 3,879 officers and men, departed on her next trip to France. Cruisers Pueblo, and destroyers  and  ushered the transports to France, where they arrived on 7 August. Finland arrived back in the United States on 25 August.

After embarking 3,678 troops,  Finland departed again on 15 September sailing with Henderson, Martha Washington, Pocahontas, Powhatan, and steamer Ulua. Escorts , Pueblo, and  helped to ensure the safe arrival of all ships in France on 28 September. Martha Washington and Pocahontas accompanied Finland on her return journey and arrived at New York on 12 October.

Finland began one last transatlantic crossing before the Armistice. In all, Finland transported 12,654 troops to France on her five Navy crossings.

As the flow of troops was reversed to bring American troops home, Finland made 8 round trips from Europe to the United States, returning 32,197 personnel to the United States. On 4 September 1919 she was transferred to the 3d Naval District and on 15 November decommissioned and delivered to the War Department, and, eventually, to the Red Star Line.

Postwar career
After a refurbishment that outfitted her for 242 first-class, 310 second-class, and 876 third-class passengers, Finland resumed her civilian career in April 1920. The liner, sailing opposite her sister ship Kroonland, returned to her original route when she departed Antwerp on 28 April for Southampton and New York. The two ships remained on that route until chartered to the American Line in mid-1923. After both ships were converted to cabin- and third-class passengers only, they sailed on the New York–Plymouth–Cherbourg–Hamburg route from June to September. On 29 September, Finland resumed New York–San Francisco service for the Panama Pacific Line; Kroonland once again joined her sister ship the following month. When  and Virginia joined the Panama Pacific fleet in 1928, Finland and Kroonland were no longer needed and both were scrapped; Finland by Hughes Bolckow Shipbreaking Ltd at Blyth, Northumberland. She arrived for breaking on 28 April 1928. Kroonland was scrapped at Genoa.

In 1925, Harold S. Vanderbilt devised the game of contract bridge while on board Finland.

Notes

References

External links 

 

1902 ships
Ocean liners
Passenger ships of Belgium
Passenger ships of the United States
Ships built by William Cramp & Sons
Maritime incidents in 1910
Transport ships of the United States Army
Transports of the United States Navy
World War I auxiliary ships of the United States
World War I passenger ships of the United States
Maritime incidents in 1917